The Zambales local elections was held on May 9, 2022 as part of the 2022 general election. Voters will select candidates for all local positions: a town mayor, vice mayor and town councilors, as well as members of the Sangguniang Panlalawigan, the vice-governor, governor and representatives for the two districts of Zambales.

Background 
Incumbent Governor Hermogenes Ebdane is running for reelection his main opponent is Incumbent 2nd District Representative Cheryl Deloso-Montalla. 

Incumbent Vice Governor Jefferson Khonghun is not running for reelection instead he run for 1st District Representative to succeed his father who are term-limited Jeffrey Khonghun, Jacqueline Rose "Jaq" Khonghun is running for Vice Governor to replaced his brother Incumbent Jefferson Khonghun, Jaq Khonghun main opponent is Ramon Lacbain II.

Gubernatorial and Vice gubernatorial elections

Governor

Result per city/municipality

Vice governor

Result per city/municipality

Congressional elections

1st District

2nd District

Provincial board elections

1st District

2nd District

City and municipal elections

1st District 
City: Olongapo
Municipalities: Castillejos, San Marcelino, Subic

Olongapo

Castillejos

San Marcelino

Subic

2nd District 
Municipalities: Botolan, Cabangan, Candelaria, Iba, Masinloc, Palauig, San Antonio, San Felipe, San Narciso, Santa Cruz

Botolan

Cabangan

Candelaria

Iba

Masinloc

Palauig

San Antonio

San Felipe

San Narciso

Santa Cruz

References 

2022 Philippine local elections
Elections in Zambales
May 2022 events in the Philippines
2022 elections in Central Luzon